Benab-e Marand (also known as Benāb Jadid, Bonāb, Banab, Benāb, and Binab is a city in the Central District of Marand County, East Azerbaijan province, Iran. At the 2006 census, its population was 4,430 in 1,236 households. The following census in 2011 counted 4,371 people in 1,401 households. The latest census in 2016 showed a population of 4,311 people in 1,461 households.

It was considered a rural area which was named Benab until 2004 but is now classed as a city and in 2004 its name changed to Benab Jadid but on July 15, 2012, after 8 years the town name changed to Benab Marand.

External links 
  Benab news website  
 Benab Marand Municipality website
 Website of Payam Noor university of Benab Marand

References 

Marand County

Cities in East Azerbaijan Province

Populated places in East Azerbaijan Province

Populated places in Marand County